The Wainfan FMX-4 Facetmobile is an American homebuilt aircraft designed by Barnaby Wainfan, a Northrop Grumman aerodynamicist and homebuilt aircraft engineer.

While only one Facetmobile prototype was produced, it has become well known due to its unique nature. The aircraft is unusual in that it is a lifting body – the whole aircraft acts as a low aspect ratio wing: a flat, angular lifting shape, unlike traditional aircraft which use distinct lift-generating wings attached to a non-lifting fuselage. Also notably the aircraft's shape is formed of a series of 11 flat surfaces, somewhat similar to the body of the F-117 Nighthawk jet strike aircraft in using flat plates, but without separate wing structures. Although aerodynamic efficiency is reduced due to the simplistic shaping, that shaping reduces structural weight, improving payload mass fraction.

Design and development

Shape
The FMX-4 Facetmobile shape forms 11 flat planes, plus two wingtip rudders.  Three flat shapes form the bottom of the aircraft (slightly inclined front, flat middle, and sharply raised back), and eight form the top (one large downwards-sloping rear section, one thin nose section, and three inclined side panels per side).  The wing section is an 18% thickness ratio, much thicker than the typical 12-15% thickness of normal light aircraft wings. At least one commercial model airplane kit of the Facetmobile is in production.

The prototype FMX-4 Facetmobile crashed on October 13, 1995, after an in-flight engine failure.  The aircraft landed at low speed into a barbed wire fence, which caused extensive skin, engine, and some structural damage, though there was no injury to the pilot, Barnaby Wainfan. As of 2006, the aircraft has been partially repaired but not flown again.

Structure
The Facetmobile structure is composed of 6061 aluminum tubing fastened with Cherrymax rivets. The fuselage uses conventional fabric covering. The aircraft uses elevons and rudders for control. The landing gear is a fixed tricycle type. The large windshield sections are augmented by two floor-mounted windows. The aircraft is boarded through a bottom-mounted hatch. The aircraft has a BRS parachute system installed.

Variants
Wainfan has proposed two derivative aircraft based on the FMX-4 Facetmobile.
 FMX-5 Facetmobile, a larger 2-seat design using the same aluminum-tube-and-fabric construction.
 An unnamed similar 2-seat design using advanced flat composite panel construction.

Specifications (Facetmobile FMX-4)

See also
Lifting body

References

External links

 Barnaby Wainfan's website, accessed October 17th, 2022.
 Quarter scale Facetmobile Youtube clip of a radio-controlled model.

1990s United States civil utility aircraft
Homebuilt aircraft
Lifting bodies
Aircraft first flown in 1993
Single-engined tractor aircraft